Abu Salim or Abou Salim may refer to:

People
Abu Salim (actor) (born 1956), Indian actor in Malayalam movies
Abu Salim (comedian) (born 1929), Lebanese actor and comedian
Abu Salim al-Ayyashi (1628–1679), travel writer, poet and scholar from Morocco
Ibrahim ibn Ali of Morocco, Abu Salim, Marinid Sultan of Morocco 1359–1361
Irfan Bakti Abu Salim (born 1951), Malaysian football (soccer) coach

Places
Abu Salim (Tripoli district), district of Tripoli, Libya 
Abu Salim prison

Other uses
Abu Salim Martyrs Brigade, an Islamist militia in Derna, Libya

See also

Salim (disambiguation)
Abu Salem (born 1968), Indian gangster